Kim Kuk-hyang is a Korean name and may refer to:

Kim Kuk-hyang (diver), North Korean diver
Kim Kuk-hyang (weightlifter), North Korean weightlifter